Game Over is a 2003 television film starring Yasmine Bleeth, Walter Koenig, Woody Jeffreys and Dominika Wolski. It incorporates footage originally shot for several video games released by Digital Pictures.

Plot
When a supercomputer is linked to a video game network, the computer programmer who designed the game must enter the virtual reality world of his fantasies and defeat the computer before it causes worldwide chaos.

Cast
 Doug Abrahams – Mr. Brinkman
 Jeremiah Birkett – Winston
 Yasmine Bleeth – Jo
 Michael Buffer – boxing announcer
 Mike Ditka – football coach
 Brian Dobson – DJ
 Andy Hirsch – Codec
 Woody Jeffreys – Steve Hunter
 Erin Karpluk – Zoey
 Walter Koenig – Drexel's body
 Dick Miller – boxing cornerman
 France Perras – Synthi
 Manny Petruzzeli – Drexel's voice
 Alvin Sanders – Professor Roswell
 Vincent Schiavelli – Dr. Hellman
 Marek Wiedman – Commander
 Dominika Wolski – Elaine Barker
 Officer Pinkerton – Craig McNair

Production

Game Over (originally titled Maximum Surge Movie) was made by combining 65 minutes of original footage with 25 minutes of footage originally filmed for full motion video sequences in five different Digital Pictures games: Maximum Surge (unreleased), Corpse Killer, Prize Fighter, Supreme Warrior, and Quarterback Attack with Mike Ditka. The storyline ties all these games together as being part of a game that the main character, Steve Hunter (played by Jeffreys), has to play in order to save the world. The villain of Maximum Surge, Drexel, is adapted to the film as a computer system created by the protagonist, with the in-game character Drexel being its avatar in virtual reality, and the dialogue of Walter Koenig portraying said avatar is dubbed over with a voice actor who also voices Drexel in the real world.

The real stars of the movie (Woody Jeffreys and Dominika Wolski) are given second billing in favor of the famous personalities who only appear in the game sequences (Koenig, Bleeth, Schiavelli). Since the game footage was taken several years before the movie was filmed, the footage quality is poorer than the rest of the film.

References

External links
Flash Film Works' information page

2003 television films
2003 films
English-language Canadian films
Films about video games
Films about virtual reality
Canadian science fiction television films
American science fiction television films
Digital Pictures
2000s English-language films
Films directed by Jason Bourque
2000s American films
2000s Canadian films